Jordan Bischel (born June 2, 1981) is an American baseball coach and former pitcher and first baseman, who is the current head baseball coach of the Central Michigan Chippewas. He played college baseball at St. Norbert College from 2000 to 2003. He served as the head coach of the Midland Warriors (2013–2014) and the Northwood Timberwolves (2015–2018).

Playing career
Bischel enrolled at the St. Norbert College, to play college baseball for the Green Knights team. Bischel played 4 years for the Green Knights, earning Second Team All-Midwest Conference North Division as a senior in 2003.

Coaching career
Bischel began his coaching career in 2004 with St. Norbert. Bischel then went on to coach at John Carroll University. He was then named the pitching coach at Northwest Missouri State University. On September 28, 2012, Bischel was named the head coach at Midland University. After helping guide the Warriors to 74 wins in two season, Bischel accepted the role of head coach at Northwood University in Midland, Michigan to be closer to home. Bischel inherited a team that had gone 18–27 in 2014, and led them to a 28–23 record in 2015. In 2017, he led Northwood to their first Great Lakes Intercollegiate Athletic Conference championship, setting a GLIAC record for wins with 46. Bischel was named the GLIAC Coach of the Year at the conclusion of the season. Northwood repeated as GLIAC champions in 2018, as well as Bischel repeating as GLIAC Coach of the Year.

On June 28, 2018, Bischel was hired as the head coach of the Central Michigan Chippewas baseball program. In his first season at the helm, Bischel electrified the storied program, leading it to its first Mid-American Conference Tournament championship and its first NCAA Tournament berth since 1995.

Head coaching record

See also
 List of current NCAA Division I baseball coaches

References

External links
Central Michigan Chippewas bio

Living people
Baseball first basemen
Baseball pitchers
St. Norbert Green Knights baseball players
St. Norbert Green Knights baseball coaches
John Carroll Blue Streaks baseball coaches
Northwest Missouri State Bearcats baseball coaches
Midland Warriors baseball coaches
Northwood Timberwolves baseball coaches
Central Michigan Chippewas baseball coaches
1981 births
Northwest Missouri State University alumni